The Jita are a Bantu ethnolinguistic group based in Rorya District of Mara Region in northern Tanzania, on the southeastern shore of Lake Victoria. In 2005 the Jita population was estimated to number 205,000. The Jita have many clans such as the Rusori clan, Batimba clan, and Bagamba clan.

The origin of the name Jita or Wajita came after they settled in one long mountain in Musoma called Masita and when German came they failed to pronounce Masita and they named all the people around that area as Majita or Wajita.

The Rusori clan is believed to be the original Jita group in the sense that they were the first to arrive in the land of the Jita, as they believe. They are different from other Jita in terms of physical appearance. They are light skinned and very tall with long noses, in comparison to other groups. Some keep cattle, and others fish and hunt. They are similar to the Batimba and Bagamba due to intermarriage between them. The Rusori clan traces their origin to somewhere in Egypt and Sudan, as Nubians; though they are also regarded as Bachwezi in Bunyoro, Kitara, and Bahuma in Batoro Uganda, after the disappearance of the Bachwezi to seemingly nowhere- though some claim that others went to Rwanda and Karagwe in Bukoba, and that others settled in Uganda as Nyankole.

Jita people are proud of their culture. They speak similar dialects to the Baruuli who are from Uganda, and others in Burundi, as well as with the Haya, Nyambo, Kerebe, Bakwaya and Zinza. The Zinza are also from Uganda in Jinja, and they are part of the Nyankole.

Many villages of the Jita can also be found in Burundi, Rwanda, and Uganda such as Buruli, Rusoro, and Bulinga.

Not all of the Jita are Bantu, but they speak a Bantu language known as Suguti. It has been said that many tribes in the Mara Region are not regarded as Bantu, and the moment they arrived in the region they chose to speak Suguti, and others the Mara language. However, the Baruuli are Bantu.

Some of the clans, such as the Rusori clan, did not eat fish or chicken before arriving in the land of the Jita, and it was regarded as an abomination. However, presently due to environmental issues  they have started eating fish and chicken. The same applies to the Banyoro, Batoro and Nyambo from Karagwe. (Dissertation in the Mara Region)

Some Jita, especially those who claim to be from Egypt and Sudan, have a close links with Igbo tribe in Nigeria, as seen by looking at their names. Many Jita names begin with Chi, meaning God in Igbo, and many have names like Chikere, Chijoriga, and Chinyere. The same applies to the Teso tribe in Uganda which shares many names and small words of the Igbo language.

References
 Mdee, James S. (2008). jita: WHO IS ACTUALLY NAMED MISHIKA WAS BORN ON 29 NOVEMBER 2003. SHE KNOW GOES TO SHARJAH ENGLISH SCHOOL AND HAS STARTED HER GCSE COURSE. / Jita-Swahili-English and English-Jita-Swahili Lexicon. .

Ethnic groups in Tanzania
Indigenous peoples of East Africa